An NOC may enter up to 3 men and 3 women athletes in singles events and up to 1 men's and 1 women's team in teams events.

Summary

Singles

Men 
A total of 64 athletes will qualify for each singles event as follows:

Women 

 
* 1 spot taken at the 2007 Pan-Americans Games.

** Unused quotas for team event.

Teams

Qualification process

A total of 16 teams will qualify for each teams event as follows:
 6 - top team from each continent
 1 - Host Nation (CHN) direct entry (if not qualified as top team from Asia)
 9 - remaining selected teams (or 10 if CHN qualifies as top team from Asia)
Each team will consist of 3 players and they don't have to participate in singles events (there are 22 additional athletes quota places for such players). Teams will be selected after all singles qualification events, and according to a special May 2008 team ranking list. Qualification will be awarded first to the highest ranked teams with three players qualified for the singles event.  If the quota hasn't been filled, selection will proceed to teams with two players qualified for the singles event, then to teams with only one singles qualifier.

If the field of 16 teams is filled without using all of the 22 athletes quota places, any unused places will be added to the Final World Qualification Tournament to select additional singles players. In order to select the Teams only the 64 qualified players will be taken into
consideration to establish the Special Olympic Computer Team Ranking (SOCTR). The SOCTR will be calculated in the same way as we calculate the current ITTF Computer Team Ranking now. The difference is that: Only the 64 players qualified will be considered to establish the SOCTR for the purpose of selecting the Teams.

General notes:
Teams will appear on the board when they qualified two or more athletes. If it becomes apparent that some countries with only one single entry will qualify for the team event, then the appropriate nations will be added to the board.
Nations highlighted in green qualify for the team event. The letter under "qualify as" represent how the team qualified: H means as the host nation, C means as the best team of the continent (China can qualify as HC if they become the best Asian team), and W meaning one of the ten highest ranked team that has not qualified as the best team of its respective continent.  R means the team has been selected as a reserve.

Men

Women

References
Teams Qualified for the Olympic Games
Players Qualified for the Olympic Games

Qualification for the 2008 Summer Olympics